USS Pierre (LCS-38) will be an  of the United States Navy.

Design
In 2002, the United States Navy initiated a program to develop the first of a fleet of littoral combat ships. The Navy initially ordered two trimaran hulled ships from General Dynamics, which became known as the  after the first ship of the class, . Even-numbered US Navy littoral combat ships are built using the Independence-class trimaran design, while odd-numbered ships are based on a competing design, the conventional monohull . The initial order of littoral combat ships involved a total of four ships, including two of the Independence-class design. On 29 December 2010, the Navy announced that it was awarding Austal USA a contract to build ten additional Independence-class littoral combat ships.

Construction and Career 
Pierre will be built in Mobile, Alabama by Austal USA.

References

 

Proposed ships of the United States Navy
Independence-class littoral combat ships